Joseph James Russell (August 23, 1854 – October 22, 1922) was a U.S. Representative from Missouri.

Born in Mississippi County near Charleston, Missouri, Russell attended the public schools and Charleston Academy. He was admitted to the bar in 1876 and commenced practice in Charleston, Missouri. He graduated from the law department of the University of Missouri in 1880. He served as School commissioner for Mississippi County in 1878 and 1879. He served as prosecuting attorney from 1880–1884. He served as a delegate to the Democratic National Convention in 1884. He served as a member of the State house of representatives in 1886–1890 and served as speaker pro tempore of the house in 1886 and as speaker in 1888.

Russell was elected as a Democrat to the Sixtieth Congress (March 4, 1907 – March 3, 1909). He was an unsuccessful candidate for reelection in 1908 to the Sixty-first Congress.

Russell was elected to the Sixty-second and to the three succeeding Congresses (March 4, 1911 – March 3, 1919). He was an unsuccessful candidate for reelection in 1918 to the Sixty-sixth Congress. He died in Charleston, Missouri, October 22, 1922. He was interred in the Odd Fellows Cemetery.

References

1854 births
1922 deaths
University of Missouri alumni
Speakers of the Missouri House of Representatives
Democratic Party members of the United States House of Representatives from Missouri
People from Charleston, Mississippi